The Centre for Gender Equality (formally Kompetansesenter for likestilling) was a Norwegian government agency that existed from 1997 to 2006 to promote gender equality. It was a successor to the Council for Gender Equality, that existed from 1973 to 1997. In 2006, its responsibilities were transferred to the new Equality and Anti-Discrimination Ombudsman.

Since 2008, the name Likestillingssenteret has been used by an unrelated, private organisation.

Directors
Ingunn Yssen (1997–2002)
Long Litt Woon (2003–2005)

Office manager Mona Larsen-Asp was acting director 2002–2003.

References

Defunct government agencies of Norway